Ferreñafe may refer to

 Ferreñafe, town in Peru
 Ferreñafe District, Peru
 Ferreñafe Province, Peru